The Church of Saint-Léon-de-Westmount is a Roman Catholic church located in Westmount, Quebec at 4311 De Maisonneuve Boulevard West. Built in 1901, the church was designed by well known Montreal architect Georges-Alphonse Monette and decorated by Guido Nincheri from 1901 to 1903, using the wet plaster buon fresco technique. Designed in the Romanesque Revival style, and featuring an Italianate façade with bell tower, the Church of Saint-Léon-de-Westmount was designated a National Historic Site of Canada in 1997 and plaqued in 1999.

Romain Pelletier was notably the church's organist from 1909 to 1951. His brother Frédéric Pelletier also briefly served as choirmaster at the church.

References

External links

Paroisse Saint-Léon de Westmount 

L
Leon-de-Westmount
National Historic Sites in Quebec
Saint-Leon-de-Westmount
Saint-Leon-de-Westmount
Saint-Leon-de-Westmount
Leon-de-Westmount
20th-century Roman Catholic church buildings in Canada
Italianate church buildings